Waupaca High School is a public high school located in Waupaca, Wisconsin. The school educates about 700 students in grades 9 to 12.

History 
Waupaca High School moved to its current location in 2000 with the completion of a new facility. Waupaca Middle School occupies the former high school building.

Academics 
Waupaca High School's academic offerings include core mathematics, English, social sciences, and pure and applied sciences.

Extracurricular activities 
Waupaca High School offers extracurricular activities that include chess, forensics, dance, a math team, debating, solo and ensemble instrumental music, drama, solo and ensemble vocal music, FFA, an art club, SADD, Beat the Heat, a Spanish club, STARS, a German club, student council, VICA, Key Club, National Honor Society, yearbook, robotics, and a pep club.

The Waupaca High School Chess Team won the Division 1 state Scholastic Chess Championship in 2022. They are the smallest and most northern school to ever win the title.

Enrollment 
From 2000 to 2019, high school enrollment declined 28.0%.

Enrollment at Waupaca High School, 2000–2019

Athletics 
Waupaca's athletic teams are known as the Comets, and compete primarily in the North Eastern Conference except for football, where they compete in the Bay Conference. The Comets have won seven WIAA state championships.

References

External links 
 Waupaca High School Online

Public high schools in Wisconsin
Schools in Waupaca County, Wisconsin